Kilwinnet is the name of two Scottish landed estates, one in Stirlingshire dating from the 13th century, and the other in Ayrshire from 1992 - both currently owned by the Wilson family.

John Wilson of Kilwinnet is head of the heraldic House of Wilson of Kilwinnet, Ayrshire.

References

External links
Wilson of Kilwinnet

Geography of Scotland